Sunset Hill, also known as Mrs. Eugene D. Stocker Estate, is a historic home complex located just north of the Village of Richfield Springs in the Town of Warren in Herkimer County, New York. The contributing elements consist of the main house, guest house, equipment barn, stable, stone entrance gate, swimming pool, and garden. The main house was built in 1923 and is a two-story, gable roofed, wood frame Colonial Revival style building sheathed in clapboard siding with a wood shingle roof.  It features a tall portico with square columns and a triangular pediment.  The complex was designed by Dwight James Baum (1886–1939) as a seasonal estate for Mrs. Eugene D. Stocker.

It was listed on the National Register of Historic Places in 2007.

References

Houses on the National Register of Historic Places in New York (state)
Colonial Revival architecture in New York (state)
Houses completed in 1923
Houses in Herkimer County, New York
National Register of Historic Places in Herkimer County, New York